The 1963–64 Chicago Black Hawks season was the Hawks' 38th season in the NHL, and the club was coming off a second-place finish in 1962–63, as Chicago won a team record 32 games and also set a club record with 81 points. The Hawks would then be defeated by the Detroit Red Wings in the NHL-semi finals, making it the first time since 1960 that Chicago did not play in the Stanley Cup finals.

During the off-season, the Blackhawks decided not to bring back head coach Rudy Pilous, and hired former Toronto Maple Leafs head coach Billy Reay to replace him, where he coached from 1957–59, posting a record of 26–50–14. Reay had most recently been the head coach of the Buffalo Bisons of the AHL.

Chicago started the year off on a hot streak, as they opened the season off with a 15–2–6 record in their first 23 games. The Hawks cooled down, but remained in a battle with the Montreal Canadiens and Toronto Maple Leafs for first place in the NHL. The Hawks and Maple Leafs played a wild game on December 7, which resulted in a bench clearing brawl after Leafs player Bobby Baun dragged Blackhawk Reg Fleming out of the penalty box, as Fleming was about to serve a penalty for spearing Toronto player Eddie Shack. A total of seven major penalties, six misconducts, three game misconducts and $25 fines were issued against 22 players who left the bench. Hawks head coach Billy Reay and Leafs head coach Punch Imlach were fined $1000, while Reg Fleming received a $200 fine, and Murray Balfour was hit for a $100 fine for Chicago, while Bobby Baun ($150), Larry Hillman ($150) and Carl Brewer ($50) received fines on the Maple Leafs. The other 22 players who left the bench also had an additional $100 fine for their role in the brawl.

The Black Hawks continued the season playing very good hockey, and ended the season finished in second place for the second consecutive season, finishing with a club record 36 wins and 84 points, as they finished one point behind the Montreal Canadiens for top spot in the NHL.

Offensively, the Hawks were led by Stan Mikita, who led the league with 89 points, winning the Art Ross Trophy for the first time in his career. Mikita also led the team with 146 penalty minutes. He became the first player to lead the league in scoring and in penalty minutes. Bobby Hull scored a league high 43 goals, and finished just behind Mikita with 87 points, while Kenny Wharram scored 39 goals and 71 points. Wharram also was awarded the Lady Byng Trophy. Pierre Pilote led the defense, scoring 7 goals and 53 points, while earning his second consecutive Norris Trophy.

In goal, Glenn Hall once again played the majority of the games, winning a club record 34 games, while posting a 2.30 GAA, and earning 7 shutouts along the way.

The Hawks would face the Detroit Red Wings in the NHL semi-finals, as Detroit finished fourth in the NHL with a record of 30–29–11, earning 71 points, which was 13 less than Chicago. The series opened up at Chicago Stadium for the opening two games, and the Black Hawks won the series opener, defeating the Red Wings 4–1, however, Detroit evened up the series in the second game with a 5–4 win. The series shifted to the Detroit Olympia for the next two games, and Detroit took a 2–1 series lead, shutting out the Hawks 3–0, however, Chicago evened the series up in the fourth game, winning 3–2 in overtime. Chicago took a series lead in the fifth game at home, holding off the Wings for a 3–2 victory, however, Detroit once again even the series up in the sixth game at the Olympia, hammering the Black Hawks 7–2, setting up a seventh and final game of the series. The Black Hawks, who had lost only five times at home all season long, were stunned by the underdog Red Wings, as Detroit won the game 4–2, and eliminated the Black Hawks for the second straight season.

Season standings

Record vs. opponents

Game log

Regular season

Detroit Red Wings 4, Chicago Black Hawks 3

Season stats

Scoring leaders

Goaltending

Playoff stats

Scoring leaders

Goaltending

Draft picks
Chicago's draft picks at the 1963 NHL Amateur Draft held at the Queen Elizabeth Hotel in Montreal, Quebec.

References

Sources
Hockey-Reference
Rauzulu's Street
Goalies Archive
HockeyDB
National Hockey League Guide & Record Book 2007

Chicago Blackhawks seasons
Chicago Black Hawks season, 1963-64
Chicago